Panicum miliaceum is a grain crop with many common names, including proso millet, broomcorn millet, common millet, hog millet, Kashfi millet, red millet, and white millet. Archaeobotanical evidence suggests millet was first domesticated about 10,000 BP in Northern China. The crop is extensively cultivated in China, India, Nepal, Russia, Ukraine, Belarus, the Middle East, Turkey, Romania, and the United States, where about half a million acres are grown each year. The crop is notable both for its extremely short lifecycle, with some varieties producing grain only 60 days after planting, and its low water requirements, producing grain more efficiently per unit of moisture than any other grain species tested. The name "proso millet" comes from the pan-Slavic general and generic name for millet. Proso millet is a relative of foxtail millet, pearl millet, maize, and sorghum within the grass subfamily Panicoideae. While all of these crops use C4 photosynthesis, the others all employ the NADP-ME as their primary carbon shuttle pathway, while the primary C4 carbon shuttle in proso millet is the NAD-ME pathway.

Evolutionary history
Panicum miliaceum is a tetraploid species with a base chromosome number of 18, twice the base chromosome number of diploid species within the genus Panicum. The species appears to be an allotetraploid resulting from a wide hybrid between two different diploid ancestors. One of the two subgenomes within proso millet appears to have come from either Panicum capillare or a close relative of that species. The second subgenome does not show close homology to any known diploid Panicum species, but some unknown diploid ancestor apparently also contributed a copy of its genome to a separate allotetraploid species Panicum repens (torpedo grass). The two subgenomes within proso millet are estimated to have diverged 5.6 million years ago. However, the species has experienced only limited amounts of fractionation and copies of most genes are still retained on both subgenomes. A sequenced version of the proso millet genome, estimated to be around 920 megabase pairs in size, was published in 2019.

Domestication and history of cultivation

Weedy forms of proso millet are found throughout central Asia, covering a widespread area from the Caspian Sea east to Xinjiang and Mongolia. These may represent the wild progenitor of proso millet or feral escapes from domesticated production. Indeed, in the United States, weedy proso millet, representing feral escapes from cultivation, are now common, suggesting current proso millet cultivars retain the potential to revert, similar to the pattern seen for weedy rice. Currently, the earliest archeological evidence for domesticated proso millet comes from the Cishan site in semiarid north east China around 8,000 BCE. Because early varieties of proso millet had such a short lifecycle, as little as 45 days from planting to harvest, they are thought to have made it possible for seminomadic tribes to first adopt agriculture, forming a bridge between hunter-gatherer-focused lifestyles and early agricultural civilizations. Archaeological evidence for cultivation of domesticated proso millet in east Asia and Europe dates to at least 5,000 BCE in Georgia and Germany (near Leipzig, Hadersleben) by Linear Pottery culture (Early LBK, Neolithikum 5500–4900 BCE), and may represent either an independent domestication of the same wild ancestor, or the spread of the crop from east Asia along trade routes through the arid steppes. Evidence for cultivation in southern Europe and the Near East is comparatively more recent, with the earliest evidence for its cultivation in the Near East a find in the ruins of Nimrud, Iraq, dated to about 700 BC.

Cultivation
Proso millet is a relatively low-demanding crop, and diseases are not known; consequently, it is often used in organic farming systems in Europe. In the United States, it is often used as an intercrop. Thus, proso millet can help to avoid a summer fallow, and continuous crop rotation can be achieved. Its superficial root system and its resistance to atrazine residue make proso millet a good intercrop between two water- and pesticide-demanding crops. The stubbles of the last crop, by allowing more heat into the soil, result in a faster and earlier millet growth. While millet occupies the ground, because of its superficial root system, the soil can replenish its water content for the next crop. Later crops, for example, a winter wheat, can in turn benefit from the millet stubble, which act as snow accumulators.

Climate and soil requirements
Due to its C4 photosynthetic system, proso millet is thermophilic like maize, so shady locations of the field should be avoided. It is sensitive to temperatures lower than 10 to 13°C. Proso millet is highly drought-resistant, which makes it of interest to regions with low water availability and longer periods without rain. The soil should be light or medium-heavy. Due to its flat root systems, soil compaction must be avoided. Furthermore, proso millet does not tolerate soil wetness caused by dammed-up water.

Seedbed and sowing 
The seedbed should be finely crumbled as for sugar beet and rapeseed. In Europe, proso millet is sowed between mid-April and the end of May. About 500 g/acre of seeds are required, which is roughly 500 grains/m22. In organic farming, this amount should be increased if a harrow weeder is used. For sowing, the usual sowing machines can be used similarly to how they are used for other crops such as wheat. A distance between the rows of 16 to 25 cm is recommended if the farmer uses an interrow cultivator. The sowing depth should be 1.5 to 2 cm in optimal soil or 3 to 4 cm in dry soil. Rolling of the ground after sowing is helpful for further cultivation. Cultivation in no-till farming systems is also possible and often practiced in the United States. Sowing then can be done two weeks later.

Field management
Only a few diseases and pests are known to attack proso millet, but they are not economically important. Weeds are a bigger problem. The critical phase is in juvenile development. The formation of the grains happens in the 3- to 5-leaf stadium. After that, all nutrients should be available for the millet, so preventing the growth of weeds is necessary. In conventional farming, herbicides may be used. In organic farming, harrow weeder or interrow cultivator use is possible, but special sowing parameters are needed.
For good crop development, fertilization with 50 to 75 kg nitrogen per hectare is recommended. Planting proso millet in a crop rotation after maize should be avoided due to its same weed spectrum. Because proso millet is an undemanding crop, it may be used at the end of the rotation.

Harvesting and postharvest treatments
Harvest time is at the end of August until mid-September. Determining the best harvest date is not easy because all the grains do not ripen simultaneously. The grains on the top of the panicle ripen first, while the grains in the lower parts need more time, making compromise and harvest necessary to optimize yield. Harvesting can be done with a conventional combine harvester with the moisture content of the grains around 15-20%. Usually, proso millet is mowed into windrows first, since the plants are not dry like wheat. There, they can wither, which makes the threshing easier. Then the harvest is done with a pickup attached to a combine.
Possible yields are between 2.5 and 4.5 tonne/ha under optimal conditions. Studies in Germany showed that even higher yields can be attained.

United States
About half of the millet grown in the United States is grown in eastern Colorado on 340,000 acres. Historically grown as animal and bird seed, as of 2020, it has found a market as an organic gluten-free grain.

Uses

Proso millet is one of the few types of millet not cultivated in Africa.
In the United States, former Soviet Union, and some South American countries, it is primarily grown for livestock feed. As a grain fodder, it is very deficient in lysine and needs complementation.
Proso millet is also a poor fodder due to its low leaf-to-stem ratio and a possible irritant effect due to its hairy stem. Foxtail millet, having a higher leaf-to-stem ratio and less hairy stems, is preferred as fodder, particularly the variety called moha, which is a high-quality fodder.

To promote millet cultivation, other potential uses have been considered recently. For example, starch derived from millets has been shown to be a good substrate for fermentation and malting with grains having similar starch contents as wheat grains. A recently published study suggested that starch derived from proso millet can be converted to ethanol with an only moderately lower efficiency than starch derived from corn. The development of varieties with highly fermentable characteristics could improve ethanol yield to that of highly fermentable corn. Since proso millet is compatible with low-input agriculture, cultivation on marginal soils for biofuel production could represent an important new market, such as for farmers in the High Plains of the US.
The demand for more diverse and healthier cereal-based foods is increasing, particularly in affluent countries. This could create new markets for proso millet products in human nutrition. Protein content in proso millet grains is comparable with that of wheat, but the share of some essential amino acids (leucine, isoleucine, and methionine) is substantially higher in proso millet. In addition, health-promoting phenolic compounds contained in the grains are readily bioaccessible, and their high calcium content favors bone strengthening and dental health. Among the most commonly consumed products are ready-to-eat breakfast cereals made purely from millet flour, and a variety of noodles and bakery products that are, however, often produced from mixtures with wheat flour to improve their sensory quality.

Pests
Insect pests include:

Seedling pests
shoot fly Atherigona pulla (proso millet shoot fly, a major pest in India and Africa)
Atherigona miliaceae, Atherigona soccata, and Atherigona punctata
wheat stem maggot Meromyza americana occurs in the United States
thrip, Haplothrips aculeatus
armyworms Mythimna separata, Mythimna unipuncta, Spodoptera exempta, and Spodoptera frugiperda
field cricket Brachytrupes sp.

Stem borers
Chilo partellus, Chilo suppressalis, Chilo orichalcociliellus, Sesamia inferens, Sesamia cretica, and Ostrinia furnacalis

Leaf feeders
leaf folders Cnaphalocrocis medinalis and Cnaphalocrocis patnalis
hairy caterpillar Spilosoma obliqua
rice butterfly Melanitis leda ismene
Moroccan locust Dociostaurus maroccanus
migratory locust Locusta migratoria
grasshoppers Hieroglyphus banian and Oxya chinensis

Earhead feeders
cotton boll worm Helicoverpa zea (in the United States)

Other pests
aphid Sipha flava (in North America)
earhead bug Leptocorisa acuta and green bug Nezara viridula suck the milky developing grains in India
termites, Odontotermes spp. and Microtermes spp., are the common species recorded on proso millet during dry seasons in India.

Names 
Names for proso millet in other languages spoken in the countries where it is cultivated include:
 
 

 or

References

External links
 
 Alternative Field Crops Manual: Millets

Millets
Panicum
Forages
Plants described in 1753
Taxa named by Carl Linnaeus
Cereals
id:Juwawut